David Ramsay may refer to:

Government and politics

Canada
 David Ramsay (Ontario politician) (1948–2020), Canadian politician in Legislative Assembly of Ontario
 Dave Ramsay (born 1970), Canadian politician in the Northwest Territories
 David William Ramsay (1943–2008), Canadian lawyer and judge

Other areas
 David Ramsay (historian) (1749–1815), American historian and politician from South Carolina
 David Ramsay (communist) (1883–1948), British socialist activist

Sir David Ramsay, 4th Baronet (after 1673–1710), among Scottish representatives to 1st Parliament of Great Britain MP for Scotland & Kincardineshire

Other
 David Ramsay (watchmaker) (died c. 1653), British clockmaker and watchmaker
 David Ramsay (trader) (c. 1740 – c. 1810), controversial trader in Upper Canada
 David Ramsay (curler) (born 1957), Scottish curler
 David Prophet Ramsay (1888–1944), Scottish painter

See also
David Ramsey (disambiguation)
David Rumsey (disambiguation)